The Entebbe Wildlife Sanctuary is found in Uganda. It was established in 1951.

References

Victoria Basin forest–savanna mosaic
Wildlife sanctuaries of Uganda